The Ikettes, originally The Artettes,  were a trio (sometimes quartet) of female backing vocalists for the Ike & Tina Turner Revue. Despite their origins, the Ikettes became successful artists in their own right. In the 1960s they had hits such as "I'm Blue (The Gong-Gong Song)" and "Peaches 'N' Cream." In 2017, Billboard ranked "I'm Blue (The Gong-Gong Song)" No. 63 on its list of 100 Greatest Girl Group Songs of All Time.

The group started as “The Artettes”, the backing group of Art Lassiter. The first official incarnation of The Ikettes was composed of Delores Johnson, Eloise Hester and Josie Jo Armstead. The most popular line-up consisted of Robbie Montgomery, Venetta Fields, and Jessie Smith. It was this trio that later morphed into The Mirettes.

As the 1960s progressed, the Ikettes became known for their sexy onstage appearance; minidresses, long hair and high-energy dance routines that mirrored their mentor Tina Turner. "They represent me, and in my act they gotta look outta sight at all times. There's simply no room for sloppiness and unprofessionalism," Tina told Esquire. She added: I also believe in the Ikette visual. I don't see it as cheap or vulgar. Nor do I see myself as that. Sex is not cheap or vulgar. And I always loved the look of long straight hair. Ike says he patterned me after Sheena of the jungle. She was white, you know. But I still love the look and action of long hair movin' and the short skirts shimmying. I want action on that stage at all times.

History

1960–1968 
When Art Lassiter didn't show up for a recording session in early 1960, Ike Turner took Lassiter's backup singers, the Artettes (Robbie Montgomery, Frances Hodges, and Sandra Harding) and had them accompany Tina Turner on the recording "A Fool in Love." Following the success of the single, Ike formed the Ike & Tina Turner Revue, but with a new group of backup singers: Delores Johnson, Eloise Hester, and Jo Armstead. Montgomery was pregnant and unable to tour. They recorded "I'm Blue (The Gong-Gong Song)" the following year, produced by Ike and leased to Atco Records. Released in November 1961, the single reached No. 3 on the Billboard R&B chart and No. 19 on the Hot 100.

Montgomery rejoined the revue shortly after having her baby and was teamed with Jessie Smith (recruited from a group named Benny Sharp and the Zorros of Rhythm) and Venetta Fields (a gospel singer from Buffalo, New York) to form the first official incarnation of The Ikettes. The revue toured constantly through the U.S. on the Chitlin' Circuit in the segregated South. Occasionally they'd play at major venues such as the Apollo Theater in New York, Howard Theater in Washington, D.C., and Uptown Theater in Philadelphia.

In 1962, Ike switched them to his Teena record label for two singles: "Crazy in Love" (credited as Robbie Montgomery & the Ikettes) and "Prisoner in Love." Soon after its release, the title of "Prisoner in Love" was changed to "No Bail in This Jail" in order to avoid confusion with "Prisoner of Love" by James Brown.

During this period Bonnie Bramlett was briefly an Ikette, becoming the first white Ikette. According to Bramlett, Smith briefly quit the Ikettes after Turner fired her boyfriend Sam Rhodes, who was the bass player in the Kings of Rhythm. Bramlett recalled that she was an Ikette for three days when she was 17. She put on a dark wig to cover her blonde hair and used Man Tan to darken her skin.

The single "Here's Your Heart" came out on Innis Records in 1964 but failed to go national; nor did "What'cha Gonna Do (When I Leave You)" released on Phi-Dan Records in 1966. From 1964 through 1966, they released six singles on Modern Records, including "The Camel Walk" (1964), and two hits "Peaches 'N' Cream" (1965) and "I'm So Thankful" (1965). Ultra-funky remakes of "Sally Go Round the Roses" and "Da Doo Ron Ron" did not go as well; neither did "He's Gonna Be Fine, Fine, Fine," though it sounded like a precursor to the music Betty Davis did later. When "Peaches and Cream" became rapidly popular, Ike sent a different set of Ikettes — Janice Singleton (Hughes), Diane Rutherford and Marquentta Tinsley — on the road with "The Dick Clark Caravan of Stars" and kept Montgomery, Smith, and Fields on tour with his revue. In the meantime, Turner hired new Ikettes after Montgomery, Fields and Smith left to form the Mirettes. The first set included Pat Arnold (a.k.a. P.P. Arnold), Gloria Scott, and Maxine Smith.

The first album by the Ikettes, Soul The Hits, was released on Modern Records in 1966. Instead of the Ikettes, the Blossoms provided backing vocals for Tina Turner on the Phil Spector-produced 1966 record "River Deep – Mountain High." Following the success of the single in Europe, Ike & Tina Turner were asked to tour with The Rolling Stones during their British tour in the fall of 1966. The Ikettes on that tour were Rose Smith, Pat Arnold, and Ann Thomas. Shelly Clark (later of Honey Cone) was also an Ikette in 1966 until she was injured in a bus accident in Wichita, Kansas. Other Ikettes during this period include Pat Powdrill, Paulette Parker (later of Maxayn), Jean Brown, and Juanita Hixson.

In 1968, Pompeii Records issued "So Fine" credited to Ike & Tina Turner & the Ikettes, it charted at No. 50 on the R&B chart. In Summer 1968, a revised lineup of Ikettes was formed with Edna Richardson, Claudia Lennear, and Esther Jones.

1969–1976 
Minit Records and its parent label Liberty Records issued singles credited to The Ikettes (with Ike & Tina Turner) in 1969 and 1970 respectively, resulting in the hits "Come Together" by the Beatles and Sly & the Family Stone's "I Want to Take You Higher." 

In November 1969, The Rolling Stones once again asked Ike & Tina Turner to open for them, but this time on their American tour. The Ikettes on that tour were Claudia Lennear, Esther Jones and Pat Powdrill. This lineup performed on Playboy After Dark in December 1969. Stonye Figueroa along with Esther Jones, and Claudia Lennear performed on The Ed Sullivan Show with Ike & Tina Turner on January 11, 1970. That month, they performed In Las Vegas at the Hilton Hotel opposite Redd Foxx. Vera Hamilton and Jean Brown joined Jones in 1970, and this trio performed on The Andy Williams Show and The Tonight Show Starring Johnny Carson.

In 1971, Liberty Records was absorbed into United Artists Records. the Ikettes released their first single "Got What It Takes (To Get What I Want)," on United Artists later that year. In 1972, "Two Timin', Double Dealin'" was released, the last known single by the Ikettes. Edna Richardson returned to the group in 1971 and remained an Ikette on-and-off until 1976. Richardson, Jean Brown and Esther Jones performed on Soul Train in April 1972. They also provided backing vocals on Gayle McCormick's album Flesh & Blood (1972). In October 1972, Tina Turner and the Ikettes performed at the political fundraising concert Star-Spangled Women for McGovern–Shriver at Madison Square Garden.
There were a few lineup changes in 1973 with the absence of Esther Jones and Enda Richardson. Jones temporarily left after she was fined for being late onstage. The Ikettes weren't paid much and were often fined by the Turners for "inexcusables" such as tardiness, no-shows at rehearsals, miscues onstage, sloppy appearance, and disruptive behavior. Jones was the "longest-lasting Ikette" and was referred to as "Motha" Ikette. She was the group's trainer and came up with most of the choreography. In February 1973, the Ikettes, consisting of Linda Sims, Linda-Shuford Williams and Alesia Butler, performed on The Midnight Special. The Ikettes performed on The Midnight Special again in November 1973; Linda Sims was joined by Edna Richardson and Charlotte Lewis. The next month Linda Sims, Charlotte Lewis and Debbie Wilson performed on the music program Hits à Gogo in Switzerland. Sims and Wilson along with Tina Turner provided backing vocals on Frank Zappa's albums Over-Nite Sensation (1973) and Apostrophe (') (1974), recorded at the Turners' Bolic Sound studio.

The last album by the Ikettes, (G)Old & New, was released on United Artists in January 1974. In March, Edna Richardson, Stonye Figueroa and Linda Sims appeared on Don Krishner's Rock Concert. Esther Jones, Yolanda Goodwin and Marcy Thomas soon replaced them for most of 1974. Richardson, Goodwin and Jones became the final lineup for the Ike & Tina Turner Revue by late 1975. They performed on Don Krishner's Rock Concert in March 1976, before the Ike & Tina Turner Revue disbanded later that year.

1988–2000s 
In 1988, Ike Turner attempted an ill-fated return to the stage with Marcy Thomas, Bonnie Johnson, and Jeanette Bazzell as his Ikettes. He was arrested on drug charges the following year. After serving 18-months in prison he managed to rehabilitate his cocaine addiction and he revived his career in the 1990s. Turner formed new sets of Ikettes, which included Jeanette Bazzell, Randi Love, a.k.a. Michelle Love, Stonye Figueroa, Vera Hamilton and Audrey Madison.

Post-Ikette careers 
 Jo Armstead, the first of the originals to leave, went solo and sang with groups before hooking up with a pre-Motown Nickolas Ashford and Valerie Simpson to form the formidable songwriting/production team of Ashford/Simpson/Armstead.
 Bonnie Bramlett formed the duo Delaney & Bonnnie with her then-husband Delaney Bramlett between 1967 and 1972. They're best known for their singles "Never Ending Song of Love", which peaked at No. 13 on the Billboard Hot 100 and "Only You Know and I Know", which peaked at No. 20.
Venetta Fields had a successful career after leaving Ike & Tina, joining Ray Charles as a Raelette, the rock bands Humble Pie and Pink Floyd as one of The Blackberries, as well as a brief stint with Delaney & Bonnie. She also appear as backing vocalists on the first album by Steely Dan. Fields acted as Barbra Streisand's backing singers (The Oreos) in the 1976 musical film, A Star Is Born (1976), and sang on its associated film soundtrack. She also worked with Humble Pie, Elkie Brooks, Neil Diamond, Steely Dan, Bob Seger, and the Rolling Stones. After emigrating to Australia in 1982, she became an Australian citizen. She recorded or toured as a backing singer for Australian artists Richard Clapton, Australian Crawl, Cold Chisel, Jimmy Barnes, James Morrison and John Farnham.
Edna Richardson (née Woods) was married to Kings of Rhythm drummer Soko Richardson, and they later divorced. In 1974, Richardson had a minor role in the blaxploitation movie Truck Turner. She played Frenchie, one of Dorinda's Girls. She later became a backup dancer for Tina Turner during her solo years under the name LeJeune Richardson.
 Janice Singleton (Hughes) left the Ikettes to lead groups on A&M (The Secrets: lead vocals on A&M recording by Diane Rutherford-Swann) and Verve (The Unit Plus), then teamed with ex-Ikette Maxine Smith (Green) on world tours with Leo Sayer, Martha Reeves, Boz Scaggs, and Joe Cocker, among others. In 2007, Singleton and Smith joined the Mohegan Sun All Stars.
 Paulette Parker later went by the name Maxayn Lewis and formed the band Maxayn with her husband Andre Lewis in the early 1970s. She has toured with Gino Vannelli, Donna Summer, and Rufus.
 Esther Jones sang with the funk/soul band Formula 5 in the 1980s. She had a stroke in 1992 and suffered from multiple myeloma. She died at the age of 61 on December 8, 2006.
 Robbie Montgomery became a Night Tripper for Dr. John. She also sang backup for Barbra Streisand, Debbie Reynolds, Joe Cocker and Stevie Wonder. She later became a successful restaurateur and star of the reality series Welcome to Sweetie Pie's. In 2018, Montgomery released an EP, What They Call Me, her first release in 40 years.
 Claudia Lennear dated Mick Jagger whom she met during Ike & Tina's U.S. tour with the Rolling Stones in 1969. She is reportedly the inspiration for the Rolling Stones song "Brown Sugar." She also dated David Bowie and reportedly is the inspiration for his song "Lady Grinning Soul." Lennear sang backup for Joe Cocker and Humble Pie and released a solo album entitled Phew! in 1973. She also played a secretary in the 1974 Clint Eastwood movie Thunderbolt and Lightfoot. The same year, she appeared in Playboy magazine photo spread. Lennear left the music industry to become a teacher. She appeared in the Academy Award-winning documentary 20 Feet from Stardom (2013).
 P.P. Arnold left the Ikettes after Ike & Tina's UK tour with the Rolling Stones in the fall of 1966. Mick Jagger encouraged her to go solo and she had a successful career in the UK with hits such as "The First Cut Is The Deepest" and "Angel of the Morning."
 Shelly Clark formed the group Honey Cone with Edna Wright (sister of Darlene Love) and Carolyn Willis in 1968. They had a number-one pop hit "Want Ads" in 1971. Clark is married to Earth, Wind & Fire bassist Verdine White.
Marcy Thomas later performed with Ike Turner. She became known as Lyrica Garrett and appeared on the reality show Love & Hip Hop: Hollywood with her daughter Lyrica Anderson.
 Ann Thomas left the Ikettes after she became pregnant by Ike Turner in 1968. After she gave birth to their daughter Mia Turner in 1969, she returned to work for the Ike & Tina Turner Revue; handling their wardrobe. Thomas was married to Turner from 1981 to 1990.
 Jeanette Bazzell Turner was married to Ike Turner from 1995 to 2000. She continues to perform and also works as a real estate broker.
 Audrey Madison Turner is Ike Turner's last wife. She appeared as a contestant on The X Factor in 2011. In 2016, she released the memoir Love Had Everything to Do with It, which details her volatile relationship with Turner due to his bipolar disorder.

Members

1960s–1970s 

Shirley Alexander, a.k.a. Shirley Butler (1969–70)
Jo Armstead (1960–c.1962)
P.P. Arnold (1965–1966)
 Mary Bennett (April–July 1978)
Bonnie Bramlett (c. 1963–1964), first white member
 Mary "Jean Brown" Standard (1967–1968, 1970–1972; died January 23, 2023)
 Alesia "Sugar" Butler (1972–1974) 
 Judy Cheeks (1975)
 Shelly Clark (c. 1966), later a member of Honey Cone
 Venetta Fields (c. 1961–1965)
 Stonye Figueroa, a.k.a. Barbara Cook (1969–1974)
 Yolanda Goodwin (1974–1976)
 Martha Graham (c. 1968)
 Vera Hamilton (1970–1971; died August 31, 2013)
 Eloise Hester (1960–?)
 Juanita Hixson (1964–?)
 Frances Hodges (1960)
 Sandra Harding (1960)
 Brenda Holloway
 Patrice Holloway
 Delores "Dee Dee" Johnson (c. 1961–1962)
 Johnnie B. Johnson-Day (early 1960s)
 Esther Jones, a.k.a. Esther Burton & Ester Bills (1968–1976; died in 2006) "longest-lasting Ikette"
 Claudia Lennear, a.k.a. Joy Lennear (1968–1970)
 Charlotte Lewis
 Kathi McDonald (c. 1969)
 Robbie Montgomery (1960–1965)
 Paulette Parker, a.k.a. Maxayn Lewis (c. 1966–1968)
 Pat Powdrill (c. 1967– 1970; died April 11, 1996)
 Vermettya Royster
 Edna "LeJeune" Richardson, a.k.a. Edna Woods (1968–1969; 1971–1976)  
 Diane Rutherford-Swann (c. 1964–1966)
 Gloria Scott (c. 1965)
 Linda Shuford-Williams, a.k.a. Linda Jones (1972–1974)
 Linda Sims
 Janice Singleton (c. 1964–1966)
 Jessie Smith (c. 1961–1965)
 Maxine Smith (1965–?)
 Rose Smith (c. 1966)
 Jackie Stanton
 Gail Stevens (1972)
 The Stovall Sisters (1967)
 (Margaret) Ann Thomas (1966–1968), "non-singing Ikette" 
 Marcy Thomas, a.k.a. Lyrica Garrett (1974–1975)
 Marquentta Tinsley (c. 1964–?)
 Adrienne Williams
 Carlena "Flora" Williams (c. 1963–64) 
 Debbie Wilson

1980s–2000s 
 Jeanette Bazzell Turner (1988–2000) 
 Bonnie Johnson (1988)
 Marcy Thomas, a.k.a. Lyrica Garrett (1988)
 Vera Hamilton (mid-1990s)
 Stonye Figueroa, a.k.a. Barbara Cook (1998)
 Randi Love, a.k.a. Michelle Love (mid 1990s–early 2000s)
 Audrey Madison Turner (1993–early 2000s)

Discography

Albums

Compilations 

 1987: Fine Fine Fine (Kent Records)
2007: Can't Sit Down... 'Cos It Feels So Good: The Complete Modern Recordings (Kent Records)

Singles 
The Ikettes had 3 songs chart on the Billboard Hot 100 and 3 songs on the Billboard Hot R&B which include 1 top 10 hit. They have also charted on records with Ike & Tina Turner.

Filmography/Selected TV appearances

References

External links
 
 
 Ikettes/Mirettes Biography and Discography on Doo Wop Heaven

American girl groups
Ike & Tina Turner members
American soul musical groups
Musical groups from St. Louis
Atco Records artists
Sonja Records artists
Phi-Dan Records artists
Modern Records artists
Liberty Records artists
United Artists Records artists
American rhythm and blues musical groups
Musical groups established in 1960
Musical groups disestablished in 1976
African-American girl groups
Musical backing groups
1960 establishments in the United States
1976 disestablishments in the United States